Mary Jeannie May Simon  (in Inuktitut syllabics: ᒥᐊᓕ ᓴᐃᒪᓐ, ; born August 21, 1947) is a Canadian civil servant, diplomat, and former broadcaster who has served as the 30th governor general of Canada since July 26, 2021. Simon is Inuk, making her the first Indigenous person to hold the office.

Simon was born in Fort Severight (now Kangiqsualujjuaq), Quebec. She briefly worked as a producer and announcer for the CBC Northern Service in the 1970s before entering public service, serving on the board of the Northern Quebec Inuit Association and playing a key role in the Charlottetown Accord negotiations. Simon was Canada's first ambassador for circumpolar affairs from 1994 to 2004, as well as a lead negotiator for the creation of the Arctic Council. She also served as the Canadian ambassador to Denmark from 1999 to 2002.

On July 6, 2021, Prime Minister Justin Trudeau announced that Queen Elizabeth II had approved the appointment of Simon as the next governor general of Canada.

Early life and education 
Simon was born Mary Jeannie May on August 21, 1947, in Fort Severight (now Kangiqsualujjuaq), Quebec, to Bob May, who was from Manitoba and of English descent, and his wife Nancy, an Inuk. Her father had relocated to the north in his youth and became manager of the local Hudson's Bay Company (HBC) store during the early 1950s. He says he was the first white employee to marry an Inuk, which the HBC banned at the time.

Simon was raised in a traditional Inuit lifestyle, including hunting, fishing, sewing Inuit clothing, and travelling by dog sled. She credits her mother and maternal grandmother Jeannie Angnatuk for passing on Inuit oral history to her.

Simon attended federal day school in Fort Chimo (now Kuujjuaq), then Fort Carson High School in Colorado, and completed her high school via correspondence in Fort Chimo.

Career

Early career 
Simon taught Inuktitut at McGill University. From 1969 to 1973, she worked as a producer and announcer for the CBC Northern Service.

Simon began her career as a public servant by being elected secretary of the board of directors of the Northern Quebec Inuit Association. In 1978, she was elected as vice-president, and later president, of the Makivik Corporation. She held the position  until 1985.

During this period she also became involved with Inuit Tapiriit Kanatami, Canada's national Inuit organization. Simon was one of the senior Inuit negotiators during the patriation of the Canadian Constitution, the First Ministers' conferences that took place from 1982 to 1992, as well as the 1992 Charlottetown Accord discussions.

She served as a member of the Nunavut Implementation Commission and as co-director (policy) and secretary to the Royal Commission on Aboriginal Peoples.

Diplomatic career 
She took on a variety of roles for the Inuit Circumpolar Conference (ICC). First as an Executive Council member from 1980 to 1983, as president from 1986 to 1992, and then as Special Envoy from 1992 to 1994. During this period she assisted in obtaining approval from the Russian government to allow the Inuit of the Chukotka Peninsula to participate in ICC. In 1986, as president of the ICC, Simon led a delegation of Canadian, Alaskan, and Greenland Inuit to Moscow and then to Chukotka to meet with Russian officials as well as the Inuit of the far east of Russia. In 1987 the ICC was successful in efforts that resulted in the Russian government allowing Russian Inuit to attend the 1989 ICC General Assembly held in Alaska.

Ambassadorship 
In 1994, Simon was appointed by Prime Minister Jean Chrétien to be Canadian Ambassador for Circumpolar Affairs, a newly created position she held until early 2004. Acting on instructions from the Government of Canada she took the lead role in negotiating the creation of an eight-country council known today as the Arctic Council. The 1996 Ottawa Declaration formally established the Arctic Council which includes the active participation of the indigenous peoples of the circumpolar world. During her chairmanship of the Arctic Council, and later as Canada's Senior Arctic Official, she worked closely with the Indigenous Permanent Participants of the Arctic Council, and the seven other Arctic Countries it comprises.

During this time period, she also held the position of Canadian Ambassador to Denmark (1999–2002), was a member of the Joint Public Advisory Committee of the Commission on Environmental Cooperation (1997–2000) and held the chairperson position for the commission from 1997 to 1998, and was appointed Councillor for the International Council for Conflict Resolution with the Carter Center in 2001.

Post-diplomatic work 
From November 2004 to February 2005, she assisted with the facilitation and write-up of reports on the "Sectoral Follow-up Sessions" announced by Prime Minister Paul Martin following the April 19, 2004 Canada-Aboriginal Peoples Roundtable on Strengthening the Relationship on Health, Life Long learning, Housing, Economic Opportunities, Negotiations, and Accountability for Results. From June 2004 to June 2007, Simon was a board member at the International Institute for Sustainable Development.

From 2004 to 2005, Simon was special advisor to the Labrador Inuit Association on the Labrador Inuit Land Claims Agreement, and she was elected president of Inuit Tapiriit Kanatami on July 7, 2006.

In 2010, Simon was reported to be under consideration for Governor General of Canada. David Johnston was ultimately appointed.

Governor General of Canada

Nomination 

The federal government began a search for a permanent replacement for Governor General Julie Payette following her resignation in early 2021. Simon was reported as a leading contender for the post early on, given her Indigenous heritage and then-political consciousness on Indigenous reconciliation. On July 6, 2021 Prime Minister Justin Trudeau announced that Queen Elizabeth II had approved Simon's appointment as the 30th Governor General of Canada. She received a customary audience with the Queen on July 22, though held virtually (instead of in-person) due to the coronavirus pandemic. She was vested with special appointments as Chancellor of the Order of Canada, the Order of Military Merit, the Order of Merit of the Police Forces and the Order of St. John (within Canada). She also received the Canadian Forces' Decoration. She was formally installed at the Senate of Canada Building on July 26.

Simon's appointment was somewhat unusual, in that she speaks English and Inuktitut but is not particularly proficient in French. This raised some complaints from francophone Canadians for breaking the tradition of French-English bilingualism.

Tenure 

On August 15, 2021, Simon approved the request of Prime Minister Justin Trudeau to dissolve Parliament and signed a writ of election for September 20.

Simon said that the word was taught to her by her mother and grandmother, and is an important concept for Inuit. According to Simon, the spirit of  drove her to get involved in movements to improve the lives of Inuit in Canada.

Germany visit 
Simon made her first trip abroad as Governor General on October 17, 2021, when she and her husband arrived in Berlin, Germany on a state visit. The trip was Canada's first state visit to Germany in over 20 years. During her visit, Simon met with President of Germany Frank-Walter Steinmeier and Chancellor of Germany Angela Merkel. In an interview with The Globe and Mail, Simon said she discussed with Steinmeier, how in fulfilling the role of head of state, to express and atone for the darkest moments of their countries' history—the Holocaust and the Residential School System. She also attended the Frankfurt Book Fair and a roundtable discussion on Arctic exploration at the Frankfurt Archaeological Museum.

The Queen's Platinum Jubilee 

On Accession Day, February 6, 2022, Simon paid tribute to the Queen in a message to mark her Platinum Jubilee. She said:

Simon and her husband met the Queen for the first time on March 15, 2022, at Windsor Castle. The Queen hosted afternoon tea for the couple. It was the first time that the Canadian monarch met the first indigenous governor general in Canadian history. Simon later said in an interview that she and the Queen discussed various issues like the 2022 Russian invasion of Ukraine, Canada convoy protests, and how they both recovered from COVID-19. Simon said she told the Queen that Canada's history books should be rewritten to reflect the facts about the relationship between the Canadian Crown and Indigenous peoples of Canada.

In May, Simon hosted the Prince of Wales and the Duchess of Cornwall on their Platinum Jubilee tour of Canada. During the tour, Simon invested the Prince as an Extraordinary Commander of the Order of Military Merit at Rideau Hall.

Simon and her husband travelled to London from June 2 to 6, 2022, to take part in the Queen's Platinum Jubilee celebrations in the United Kingdom. They attended the Service of Thanksgiving at St. Paul's Cathedral, the Platinum Party at the Palace, and the Platinum Jubilee Pageant, which included military personnel from the Canadian Armed Forces.

Simon urged all Canadians to work together, to "truly honour the life, legacy and reign of Her Majesty The Queen", and said that, to her, that is worth celebrating.

Papal visit 
On April 1, 2022, Simon released a statement following Pope Francis' apology to Indigenous delegation at the Vatican. Simon said she was grateful to the Pope for his words, and hailed it a "historic and emotional day for Indigenous peoples across Canada". She said that the apology is "one step on the road to reconciliation", and the Pope has "committed to visiting Canada to continue the reconciliation journey with Indigenous peoples on their own lands".

Pope Francis visited Canada from July 24 to 29, 2022, with Simon taking part in several events and activities during the papal visit. Following the papal apology in Maskwacis on July 25, Simon said, "Today was a day that moved us forward, giving Survivors words that may help them heal. Yet it is also a day that can raise complex emotions, especially as the Papal visit continues".

Death of the Queen 

With Queen Elizabeth II's death on September 8, 2022, Simon became the first governor general to serve under two monarchs since Lord Tweedsmuir in 1936. Simon said, "Her Majesty's warm welcome when we spent time with her earlier this year was a profound moment in our lives and a memory we will cherish forever". In a live statement to Canadians, Simon said, "Her Majesty cared about people, about our well-being. This was clear every time we spoke. She cared about Canada, and all the unique stories that make up our beautiful country".

On September 10, Simon signed the proclamation of the accession of King Charles III at Rideau Hall following a formal meeting of the King's Privy Council for Canada. In a statement, Simon said, "the Crown endures and thrives as a symbol of service, tradition and commitment. His Majesty The King ascends at an important time in history for Canada and the Commonwealth".

Simon and her husband Whit were part of the Canadian delegation to the Queen's state funeral in London on 19 September. On the occasion of the Queen's funeral, Simon said, "We were fortunate to have The Queen with us for so long. On behalf of all Canadians, I would like to thank our Queen, our monarch, one last time, for her love and her commitment to our country and our people".

Other 
In June 2022, Simon came under fire after a National Post story was published regarding exorbitant in-flight catering costs for her eight-day trip to the Middle East. Simon said the criticism was 'unfair' as she had no part in the logistics of her trips to discuss world peace but her office would try to 'minimize the cost of future voyages'.
Simon closed all commenting on her social media posts in February 2023 due to a growing number of abusive comments.

Personal life 
Simon is the second-oldest of eight children. Her brother, Johnny May, is a locally renowned bush pilot. In her youth, Simon attended an Anglican church with her family. At age 40, she developed depression and burnout due to a mental illness, but gradually overcame them.

Simon married her first husband, Robert Otis, on March 27, 1967, in Kuujjuaq. She later married George Simon, and in 1994 she married her current husband, journalist and author Whit Fraser, a former head of the Canadian Polar Commission. She has two sons and one daughter. Simon speaks English and Inuktitut, and she has committed to learn French during her tenure as governor general.

Honours 

Appointments and awards

Honorary degrees

Honorary academic positions 
 Mary May Simon was the Chancellor of Trent University (1995–1999, 2002).

Honorary military appointments

Current positions and memberships 
Simon is a fellow of the Arctic Institute of North America and of the Royal Canadian Geographical Society.

Other positions currently held by her include:
 Advisor to the European Space Agency (Arctic Monitoring Program)
 Chairperson, Arctic Children and Youth Foundation
 Board Member, Indspire
 Member of the Board of Governors, University of the Arctic
 Council Member, Crossing Boundaries National Council
 Member of Advisory Circle, Walter and Duncan Gordon Charitable Foundation
 Council Member, The National Police Services Advisory Council

Arms

Published works 
Simon is the author of many works regarding the environment, education, language, and Inuit culture:

Books
 

Book contributions
 
 
 
 

Reports
 

Articles

Notes

References

External links 

Governor General of Canada – official website

|-

|-

1947 births
Living people
People from Nunavik
Ambassadors of Canada to Denmark
Canadian women ambassadors
Academic staff of McGill University
Chancellors of Trent University
Royal Canadian Geographical Society fellows
Companions of the Order of Canada
Commanders of the Order of Military Merit (Canada)
Dames of Justice of the Order of St John
Officers of the National Order of Quebec
Recipients of Nersornaat
Indspire Awards
Canadian Inuit women
Inuit from Quebec
CBC Radio hosts
Canadian indigenous women academics
Canadian women viceroys
Governors General of Canada
Anglophone Quebec people
Canadian people of English descent
Female governors-general